Capraro is a surname. Notable people with the surname include:

 Albert Capraro (1943–2013), American fashion designer
 Primo Capraro (1873–1933), Italian-Argentine businessman